The 3rd Signal Regiment is a national support signals regiment of the Italian Army headquartered in Rome in Lazio. The regiment is the army's oldest signals regiment and assigned to the army's Signal Command. The regiment's three battalions operate and maintain the army's signal network in central Italy and Sardinia. The regiment was formed in 1883 as an engineer regiment, which in 1895 became responsible for training the army's telegraph personnel and providing telegraph units to operational units. In 1912 the regiment added the training of radio personnel to its duties. During World War I the regiment formed a total of 127 companies, 59 of which were transferred in 1918 to the newly formed 7th Signal Regiment (Telegraphers). In 1920 the regiment was disbanded and its companies formed into battalions, which were assigned the army's army corps commands.

In 1943 the Italian Co-belligerent Army formed a signal battalion for its general staff, which after the war supported the Army General staff in Rome. In 1957 the battalion was designated as X Signal Battalion. In 1975 the battalion was named for the Lanciano Pass and assigned the flag and traditions of the 3rd Engineer Regiment (Telegraphers). In 1993 battalion entered the newly formed 3rd Signal Regiment, which continued to support the army's general staff. In 1998 the regiment was tasked with the operation and maintenance of the army's signal network in central Italy and the Tuscany and Emilia-Romagna regions and therefore received the Battalion "Abetone" from the disbanded 43rd Signal Regiment and some units and personnel of the 44th Signal Regiment. In 2000 the regiment received the Battalion "Gennargentu", which operates and maintains the army's telecommunication network in Sardinia.

History 
On 1 November 1883 the 3rd Engineer Regiment was formed in Florence with companies transferred from the 1st Engineer Regiment and 2nd Engineer Regiment. Each of the two regiments transferred three telegraphers companies, two sappers companies, two Ferrovieri companies, and one train company. In 1887 the regiment transferred its four Ferrovieri companies to the 4th Engineer Regiment and received three sappers companies and one train company in return. The same year the regiment's 3rd Telegraphers Company was sent to Eritrea to participate in the Italo-Ethiopian War of 1887–1889.

In 1895 the regiment was renamed 3rd Engineer Regiment (Telegraphers). At the time the regiment consisted of a staff, four sappers-telegraphs brigades, three train companies, the depot, and a specialists brigade detached to Rome since November 1894. In April 1896 the Specialists Brigade formed a Radio-Telegraphers Section and a Field Photography Section. In September 1909 the Specialists Brigade became an autonomous unit and in 1911 it was renamed Specialists Battalion. The regiment's remaining brigades had already been renamed battalions in 1910. In July 1911 the regiment formed a fifth sappers-telegraphs battalion. The same year the regiment provided two telegraphers companies for the Italo-Turkish War. In August 1912 the task of training the personnel of the radio-telegraphic service was transferred to the 3rd Engineer Regiment (Telegraphers).

World War I 
At the outbreak of World War I the regiment mobilized the following units for service on the Italian front: 24 telegraphers companies, four telegraphers sections for cavalry divisions, nine radio-telegraphers sections, one train company, and five mobile militia companies that served as infantry. Until the war's end the regiment formed in total 127 telegraphers companies, 59 of which were transferred to the 7th Signal Regiment (Telegraphers) upon that regiment's formation on 1 July 1918. Inventor Guglielmo Marconi served as officer in the regiment during the war.

After the war the regiment was disbanded on 31 March 1920 and its companies used to form a telegraphers battalion for each army corps on 1 April 1920.

World War II 
At the outbreak of World War II the 10th Engineer Regiment's depot in Santa Maria Capua Vetere formed the X Connections Battalion, which served with the X Army Corps, while the 8th Engineer Regiment's depot in Rome formed the X Telegraphers Battalion and X Marconists Battalion, the latter of which was moved to the Forte Trionfale in Rome as a support unit of the Army General Staff. After the announcement of the Armistice of Cassibile on 8 September 1943 the battalions were disbanded by invading German forces.

In November 1943 the Italian Co-belligerent Army formed the Army General Staff Signal Battalion in Monteroni di Lecce, which moved to Rome after the city had been liberated in June 1944. The battalion consisted of a telegraphers company, a marconisti company, and a network and operations office.

Cold War 
On 11 January 1947 the Army General Staff Signal Battalion was renamed Ministry of War Special Connections Battalion and consisted of a command, a teleradio company, a marconisti company, two special marconisti companies, and a network and operations office. On 1 October 1952 the Connections Speciality became an autonomous speciality of the Engineer Arm, with its own school and gorget patches. On 16 May 1953 the speciality adopted the name Signal Speciality and consequently the battalion was renamed Ministry of Defense-Army Special Signal Battalion in January 1954. In 1957 the battalion was renamed X Signal Battalion and thus became the spiritual successor of the three World War II battalions with the same number.

During the 1975 army reform the army disbanded the regimental level and newly independent battalions were granted for the first time their own flags. During the reform signal battalions were renamed for mountain passes. On 31 December 1975 the X Signal Battalion was renamed 10th Signal Battalion "Lanciano" and assigned the flag and traditions of the 3rd Engineer Regiment (Telegraphers). The 10th Signal Battalion "Lanciano" consisted of a command, a command and services platoon, and three signal companies. The battalion was assigned to the Army General Staff's Signal Inspectorate and had territorial functions, while operational tasks were assigned to the 11th Signal Battalion "Leonessa".

In 1984 the command and services platoon was expanded to command and services company, while one of the battalion's three signal companies was disbanded.

Recent times 
On 24 September 1993 the 10th Signal Battalion "Lanciano" lost its autonomy and the next day the battalion entered the newly formed 3rd Signal Regiment as Battalion "Lanciano". On the same date the flag and traditions of the 3rd Engineer Regiment (Telegraphers) were transferred from the battalion to the 3rd Signal Regiment.

In 1998 the regiment was tasked with the operation and maintenance of the army's signal network in central Italy and the Tuscany and Emilia-Romagna regions and therefore received on 9 September 1998 the Battalion "Abetone" and 7th TLC Section in Florence, and the 6th TLC Section in Bologna from the disbanded 43rd Signal Regiment. On 1 October 1998 the regiment joined the army's C4 IEW Command and on 1 December of the same year the regiment received the 8th TLC Section in Rome and the 13th TLC Section in Pescara from the 44th Signal Regiment, which was reorganized on the same date as 44th TLC Support Regiment. During the year 2000 the regiment also received the Battalion "Gennargentu", which operates and maintains the army's telecommunication network in Sardinia.

Current structure 
As of 2023 the 3rd Signal Regiment operates and maintains the army's telecommunication network in the 
Abruzzo, Emilia-Romagna, Lazio, Marche, Tuscany, Sardinia, and Umbria regions and consists of:

  Regimental Command, in Rome
 Command and Logistic Support Company, in Rome
  Battalion "Lanciano", in Rome
 1st Area Support Signal Company
 2nd C4 Support Signal Company
 3rd C4 Support Signal Company
  Battalion "Abetone", in Florence
 Command and Logistic Support Company
 4th Area Support Signal Company
 5th C4 Support Signal Company
  Battalion "Gennargentu", in Cagliari
 Command and Logistic Support Company
 6th C4 Support Signal Company 
 Area Support Signal Platoon
 8th C4 Maintenance Unit, in Rome
 8th C4 Maintenance Unit Detachment, in Pescara
 14th C4 Maintenance Unit, in Cagliari
 67th C4 Maintenance Unit, in Florence
 67th C4 Maintenance Unit Detachment, in Bologna
 Computer Incident Response Team, in Rome

The Command and Logistic Support Company fields the following platoons: C3 Platoon, Transport and Materiel Platoon, Medical Platoon, and Commissariat Platoon. The Battalion "Lanciano" operates army's network in Lazio, Abruzzo, Marche, Umbria, and Molise, while the Battalion "Abetone" operates the network in Tuscany and the Emilia-Romagna, and the Battalion "Gennargentu" the network in Sardinia.

External links
Italian Army Website: 3° Reggimento Trasmissioni

References

Signal Regiments of Italy